Note: This ship should not be confused with the steamer Alameda, considered for World War I service as USS Alameda (ID-1432), but also never acquired or commissioned.

USS Alameda (SP-1040) was the proposed designation for a motorboat that never actually served in the United States Navy.

Alameda was a private motorboat built in 1917 by the Western Boat Building Co at Tacoma, Washington, probably for use as a fishing vessel. In the spring of 1917, the U.S. Navy inspected her in for possible World War I service as a patrol boat, and she was registered accordingly with the naval section patrol designation SP-1040. Though her official data card describes her as "brand new well and staunchly built" and contains a note that she was reported to have been delivered to the Navy and commissioned on 2 June 1917. However, no records exist that show that the Navy ever took possession of or commissioned Alameda, and she appears to have had no naval service.

Notes

References

Department of the Navy: Naval Historical Center: Online Library of Selected Images: Civilian Ships: Alameda (American Motor Boat, 1917)
NavSource Online: Section Patrol Craft Photo Archive Alameda (SP 1040)

External links 
Adam S. Eterovich: Croatian Heritage Biographies K - R; contains short history of Western Boat Building Co

Cancelled ships of the United States Navy
Patrol vessels of the United States Navy
World War I patrol vessels of the United States
Ships built in Tacoma, Washington
1917 ships
Ships built by the Western Boat Building Company